José Ángel Arcega Aperte (born 31 May 1964) is a retired basketball player from Spain. Arcega competed in the men's tournament at the 1992 Summer Olympics. His brother Fernando also represent Spain in the Olympics. Arcega's nephew, J. J. Arcega-Whiteside, played for the Philadelphia Eagles and Seattle Seahawks.

References

External links
 

1964 births
Living people
Basketball players at the 1992 Summer Olympics
CB Zaragoza players
Liga ACB players
Olympic basketball players of Spain
Saski Baskonia players
Spanish men's basketball players
1990 FIBA World Championship players
Sportspeople from Zaragoza